Order of Civil Merit is a Syrian decoration. It was established on 25 June 1953. The decoration is awarded for service to the state or to the Arab cause. It has five classes, including the Excellent Class awarded in badge of star; the First Class, awarded in badge or star; the Second Class; the Third Class and the Fourth Class. The Excellent and the First Class are worn on a suit, while the Second Class is worn on a ribbon around the neck. The Third and the Fourth Class are worn on a ribbon on the right side of a chest. The colours of the decoration's ribbon are white-green-white, each represented in equal ratio.

Notable recipients 

 Khaled al-Asaad
 Bashar al-Assad
 Pavel Belyayev
 Djamila Bouhired
 Prince Carlo, Duke of Castro
 Georges Catroux
 Alexander Dzasokhov
 Sabah Fakhri
 Gustáv Husák
 Aram Karamanoukian
 Alexander Kinshchak
 Samir Kuntar
 Duraid Lahham
 Alexei Leonov
 Muhammad al-Maghut
 Nazir Nabaa
 Abdul-Salam Ojeili
 Dawoud Rajiha
 Asad Rustum
 Sabah Al-Ahmad Al-Jaber Al-Sabah
 Adib Shishakli
 Rafiq Subaie
 Michel Suleiman
 Valentina Tereshkova
 Muna Wassef
 Dmitry Yazov
 Ra'ad bin Zeid
 Walid Muallem

References

Civil Merit
Awards established in 1953
Orders of merit
1950s establishments in Syria